The 2026 United States attorney general elections will be held on November 3, 2026, to elect the attorneys general of thirty U.S. states, two territories, and one federal district. The previous elections for this group of states took place in 2022, while Vermont's attorney general will be elected in 2024.

These elections will take place concurrently with various other federal, state, and local elections.

Race summary

States

Territories and federal district

See also 
 2026 United States elections

Notes

References